Beverly National Cemetery is a United States National Cemetery located in Edgewater Park Township, in Burlington County, New Jersey, United States. Administered by the United States Department of Veterans Affairs, it encompasses , and as 2021 had over 50,000 interments.

History

The original cemetery was only a single acre off of Beverly's Monument Cemetery, purchased from a local resident in 1863 for the purpose of interring Union Army casualties who died in the Beverly United States Army hospital (run for the duration of the Civil War).  Additional land was acquired in 1936, 1937, 1948, and 1951. It served as a burial ground only for those veterans who died in nearby hospitals, until space in the nearby Philadelphia National Cemetery became limited, and many interments that would have been made there were made at Beverly instead. Beverly National Cemetery was listed on the National Register of Historic Places in 1997.

Notable interments
 Medal of Honor recipients
 Hospital Corpsman Third Class Edward Clyde Benfold, recipient for action in the Korean War
 Sergeant First Class Nelson Vogel Brittin,  recipient for action in the Korean War
 Private First Class John W. Dutko, recipient for action in Italy during World War II
 First Sergeant Bernard Strausbaugh, recipient for action at the Second Battle of Petersburg during the Civil War.
 Others
 Robert Elliott Burns, author who wrote I Am a Fugitive from a Georgia Chain Gang!
 Les Damon, actor
 Socks Seibold, Major League Baseball player

See also

 National Register of Historic Places listings in Burlington County, New Jersey

References

External links
 National Cemetery Administration
 Beverly National Cemetery
 
 
 

Second Empire architecture in New Jersey
Victorian architecture in New Jersey
1863 establishments in New Jersey
Cemeteries in Burlington County, New Jersey
United States national cemeteries
Cemeteries on the National Register of Historic Places in New Jersey
Historic American Landscapes Survey in New Jersey
Edgewater Park, New Jersey
National Register of Historic Places in Burlington County, New Jersey